Radosław Słodkiewicz (born June 11, 1976) is a Polish body builder. He made his debut in 1992 in the Grand Prix in Szczecin.

Achievements 

 1996 - first place in the junior classification
 2000 - fourth place in the Polish championships
 2002 - winner of Polish Championship

Details 

 chest 140 cm
 biceps 52 cm
 waist 87 cm
 thigh 80 cm
 calf 51 cm
 weight 110 kilos, 120 kg off season

References 

Living people
Polish bodybuilders
1976 births
People from Goleniów
Sportspeople from West Pomeranian Voivodeship